Anton Evtimov (born 27 June 1973) is a Bulgarian former footballer. He is considered to be one of the greatest footballers in Minyor Pernik's history.

Career
Born in Pernik, Evtimov started to play football in Minyor. Until the 2009-10 season, he played 191 matches for the club, scoring 62 goals. On 6 May 2000, Anton Evtimov scored a hat-trick against Minyor's biggest rivals Levski Sofia bringing the victory 3:2 for his team. Evtimov has also played for Lokomotiv Sofia, Marek Dupnitsa, Makedonska Slava and FC Strumska slava.

In June 2009, Minyor signed the 36-year-old footballer for the fourth time in his career. He also became a playing assistant-manager.

References

Bulgarian footballers
1973 births
Living people
First Professional Football League (Bulgaria) players
PFC Minyor Pernik players
FC Lokomotiv 1929 Sofia players
PFC Marek Dupnitsa players
PFC Pirin Blagoevgrad players

Association football forwards
People from Pernik